Jhargram Municipality is responsible for the civic infrastructure and administration of the town of Jhargram, West Bengal, India.

Structure
Established in 1982, the municipality refers to the board of Councillors, with one Councillor being elected from each of the 18 wards of Jhargram town. The Board of Councillors elects a Chairman from among its elected members.

According to the West Bengal Municipal Act, 1993, Jhargram municipality is run by the Chairman-in-Council system of governance and consists of the Chairman, the Vice-Chairman, and Chief Executive Officer. The Chairman is the executive head of the municipality and the municipal administration is under his control. The Chairman nominates the Chairman-in-Council and distributes the various functions of the municipality. The Chairman presides over the meetings of the Chairman-in-Council as well as the board of Councillors, and in his absence, the Vice-Chairman chairs the meetings. The administrative functions of the municipalities are dealt with through the committees and are headed by the Chairman-in-Council.

References

Municipalities of West Bengal